Inmaculada Vicent (born 9 December 1967) is a Spanish judoka. She competed in the women's heavyweight event at the 1992 Summer Olympics.

References

1967 births
Living people
Spanish female judoka
Olympic judoka of Spain
Judoka at the 1992 Summer Olympics
Sportspeople from Madrid
20th-century Spanish women